The 2002 FIFA World Cup qualification competition was a series of tournaments organised by the six FIFA confederations. Each confederation — the AFC (Asia), CAF (Africa), CONCACAF (North, Central America and Caribbean), CONMEBOL (South America), OFC (Oceania), and UEFA (Europe) — was allocated a certain number of the 32 places at the tournament. 199 teams entered the tournament qualification rounds, competing for 32 spots in the final tournament. South Korea and Japan, as the co-hosts, and France, as the defending champions, qualified automatically, leaving 29 spots open for competition.

Qualified teams

1Includes 10 appearances by DFB representing West Germany between 1954 and 1990. Excludes 1 appearance by DVF representing East Germany between 1954 and 1990.

2Includes appearances by USSR.

Qualification process
The 32 spots available in the 2002 World Cup would be distributed among the continental zones as follows:
 Europe (UEFA): 14.5 places, 1 of them went to automatic qualifier France, while the other 13.5 places were contested by 50 teams. The winner of the 0.5 place would advance to the intercontinental play-offs (against a team from AFC)
 South America (CONMEBOL): 4.5 places, contested by 10 teams. The winner of the 0.5 place would advance to the intercontinental play-offs (against a team from OFC).
 North, Central America and Caribbean (CONCACAF): 3 places, contested by 35 teams.
 Africa (CAF): 5 places, contested by 51 teams.
 Asia (AFC): 4.5 places, 2 of them went to automatic qualifiers South Korea and Japan, while the other 2.5 places were contested by 40 teams. The winner of the 0.5 place would advance to the intercontinental play-offs (against a team from UEFA).
 Oceania (OFC): 0.5 place, contested by 10 teams. The winner of the 0.5 place would advance to the intercontinental play-offs (against a team from CONMEBOL).

A total of 193 teams played at least one qualifying match. A total of 777 qualifying matches were played, and 2452 goals were scored (an average of 3.17 per match).

Confederation qualification

AFC

The Asian Football Confederation was allocated four and half qualifying berths for the 2002 FIFA World Cup, South Korea and Japan, the co-hosts, qualified automatically, leaving two and half spots open for competition between 40 teams. Myanmar withdrew from the tournament after being placed in group 2 but before any matches had been played, therefore reducing the group to 3 teams.

Afghanistan, Bhutan and North Korea chose not to participate.

Asia's two remaining automatic qualifying berths were taken by Saudi Arabia and China. Iran that defeating United Arab Emirates to become possible fifth Asian qualifier, fails after losing their AFC/UEFA playoff against Republic of Ireland.

There were three rounds of play:
First stage: The 39 teams were divided into 9 groups of 4 teams each, and 1 group of 3 teams. The teams played against each other twice, except in group 2, where the teams played against each other once. The group winners would advance to the final round.
Second stage: The 10 teams were divided into 2 groups of 5 teams. The teams played against each other on a home-and-away basis. The group winners would qualify. The runners-up would advance to the AFC play-off.
Play-off: The 2 teams played against each other on a home-and-away basis. The winner would advance to the UEFA/AFC Intercontinental play-off.

Final positions (second round)

AFC play-off

|}

CAF

The Confederation of African Football was allocated five qualifying berths for the 2002 FIFA World Cup. 51 teams entered the qualification process.

Burundi withdrew before the draw was made while Niger and Comoros chose not to participate. 

Guinea was excluded from the competition during the Final Round for government interference with its national association, resulting in their results obtained in final round annulled.

Africa's five automatic qualifying berths were taken by Cameroon, Senegal, Tunisia, South Africa, and Nigeria.

There were two rounds of play:
 First Round: The 50 teams were divided into 5 pools of 10 teams each. In each pool, the 10 teams were paired up to play knockout matches on a home-and-away basis. The winners advanced to the Final Round.
 Final Round: The 25 teams were divided into 5 groups of 5 teams each. The teams played against each other on a home-and-away basis. The group winners qualified.

Final positions (final round)

CONCACAF

A total of 35 CONCACAF teams entered the competition. Mexico, USA, Jamaica and Costa Rica, the four highest-ranked teams according to FIFA, received byes and advanced to the semi-finals, while Canada advanced to the play-offs . The remaining teams were divided into  zones, based on geographical locations, as follows:
Caribbean Zone: The 24 teams were divided into  groups of eight teams each. The teams played in a three-round knockout tournament. The winners would advance to the semi-finals, while the runners-up would advance to the play-offs.
Central American Zone: The six teams are divided into  groups of three teams each. The teams played against each other. The winners of the group would advance to the semi-finals, while the runners-up would advance to the play-offs.
Play-offs: the six teams were paired up to play knockout matches on a home-and-away basis. A team from North or Central America would play against a team from the Caribbean, and the winners would advance to the semi-finals.
Semi-finals: the 12 teams were divided into three groups of four teams each. They played against each other on a home-and-away basis. The group winners and runners-up would advance to the final round.
Final round: the six teams played against each other on a home-and-away basis. The top three teams would qualify for the 2002 FIFA World Cup.

Final positions (final round)

CONMEBOL

A total of 10 CONMEBOL teams entered the competition. competing for four and half places in the final tournament.

The 10 teams played against each other on a home-and-away basis. The top 4 teams qualified. The 5th-placed team advanced to the CONMEBOL / OFC Intercontinental play-off.

Final positions

OFC

A total of 10 teams entered the competition. competing for a half places in the final tournament.

Papua New Guinea chose not to participate. 

There would be two rounds of play:
 First Round: The 10 teams were divided into two groups of five teams each. The teams played against each other once. The group winners would advance to the Final Round.  
 Final Round: The two teams played against each other on a home-and-away basis. The winner would advance to the CONMEBOL/OFC Intercontinental play-off.

Australia's 31–0 win over American Samoa established a World Cup record for the highest margin of victory in a qualifying match.

Final positions (final round)

|}

UEFA

The European section acted as qualifiers for the 2002 FIFA World Cup, for national teams which are members of the Union of European Football Associations (UEFA). Apart from France, who qualified automatically as holders, a total of thirteen and half slots in the final tournament were available for UEFA teams.

The 50 teams were divided into nine groups, five groups of six teams and four groups of five teams. The teams played against each other on a home-and-away basis. The group winners would qualify. Among the runners-up, the runner-up of group 2 was drawn randomly to advance to the UEFA–AFC Intercontinental play-off. The other runners-up would advance to the UEFA play-offs.

In the play-offs, the eight teams were paired up to play knockout matches on a home-and-away basis. The four aggregate winners qualified. The qualifying process started on 2 September 2000, after UEFA Euro 2000, and ended on 14 November 2001.

The Netherlands and Romania both failed to qualify for the tournament for the first time since 1986, the former finishing third in group 2 behind Portugal and Republic of Ireland and the latter suffering a shock loss to Slovenia in the play-offs.

Final positions (first round)

Play-offs

|}

Inter-confederation play-offs

There were two scheduled inter-confederation playoffs to determine the final two qualification spots to the finals. The first legs were played on 10 and 20 November 2001, and the second legs were played on 15 and 25 November 2001.

UEFA v AFC

OFC v CONMEBOL

Top goalscorers

16 goals
 Archie Thompson

15 goals
 Carlos Pavón 

14 goals
 David Zdrilic 

11 goals
 Golman Pierre 
 Ibrahima Bakayoko 
 Hani Al-Dhabit
 Talal Al-Meshal 
 Said Bayazid 

10 goals
 Rolando Fonseca
 Ali Daei 
 Obeid Al-Dosari 
 Kiatisuk Senamuang
 Andriy Shevchenko
 Yaser Salem Ali 
 Jafar Irismetov

Trivia
On their way to the 2002 World Cup, Brazil endured their worst qualifying campaign ever, losing 6 matches (the only time they have lost more than 2 games in a qualifying campaign) and finishing 3rd of the South American qualifying group (the only time they have not emerged as leaders of their qualifying group). However, Brazil went on to win the 2002 World Cup with a record-breaking tally of 7 wins in 7 matches in the final competition, without facing extra time or penalty shoot-outs. The following teams also won all their final competition matches: Uruguay in 1930 (4 games), Italy in 1938 (4 games, 1 of which after extra time), Brazil in 1970 (6 games) and France in 1998 (7 games, of which 1 with a golden goal during extra time and 1 on penalties). In 1970, Brazil had also won all of their 6 preliminary competition matches. Uruguay did not play any preliminary round for 1930, as there was none, and Italy did not either for 1938 as they were automatically qualified for the World Cup as title holders.
After finishing second in the group, where they famously lost 1–5 to England, Germany had to play qualifying play-offs for the only time in their history.
Australia netted 31 goals against newcomers American Samoa, setting the record of the highest-scoring match and biggest margin of victory in an international match ever. This was only two days after Australia thrashed Tonga 22–0, a then international record. Also, Archie Thompson's 13 goals in the match against American Samoa surpassed the previous record of 10.
Souleymane Mamam of Togo became the youngest player ever to play in a World Cup qualifying match at the age of 13 years and 310 days in the match against Zambia, in May 2001. He subbed in for Komlan Assignon, three minutes from full-time.
The fastest-ever hat-trick in an "A" international was set when Abdul Hamid Bassiouny of Egypt needed only 177 seconds to bag his three goals in a game against Namibia.
Switzerland's Kubilay Türkyilmaz scored a hat trick exclusively from penalties against the Faroe Islands. Brazil's Ronaldo would equal this against Argentina in his team's 3–1 win in the 2006 World Cup qualifying round.

Notes

References

External links

RSSSF – 2002 World Cup Qualification

 
Qualification
FIFA World Cup qualification